The Slovenia women's national under-20 basketball team is a national basketball team of Slovenia, administered by the Basketball Federation of Slovenia. It represents the country in women's international under-20 basketball competitions.

FIBA U20 Women's European Championship participations

See also
Slovenia women's national basketball team
Slovenia women's national under-18 basketball team
Slovenia women's national under-16 basketball team

References

External links
Archived records of Slovenia team participations

Basketball in Slovenia
Basketball
Women's national under-20 basketball teams